Bangu Atlético Clube, commonly known as Bangu, is a Brazilian professional association football club based in Rio de Janeiro, in the western neighbourhood of Bangu. The team plays in Série D, the fourth tier of the Brazilian football league system, as well as in the Campeonato Carioca, the top tier of the Rio de Janeiro state football league.

The club competed in the Campeonato Brasileiro Série A several times, finishing as runner-up in 1985. Their home stadium is the Estadio Moça Bonita, which has a capacity of 15,000.

History
The club has its origins in Fábrica Bangu (Bangu Factory), located in Bangu neighborhood, Rio de Janeiro. Some Britons that worked at the factory, especially Thomas Donohoe, introduced football to the factory workers by bringing footballs to the place and organizing the first football match in Brazil. In December 1903, Andrew Procter suggested the foundation of a club, when he realized how enthusiastic his colleagues were for football. The club was founded on April 17, 1904 as Bangu Atlético Clube. Bangu was the first football club in Brazil to feature black and mulatto players.

In 1933, Bangu won its first state championship.

In 1966, Bangu won its second state championship in a game played in the world's largest stadium filled with over 120,000 fans, the Maracana. They beat powerhouse Flamengo 3–0 in a game remembered by a big brawl caused by Flamengo's players, in which several players got ejected afterwards. In 1967, Bangu, as the Houston Stars, represented the city of Houston in the United Soccer Association. The club finished with four victories, four draws and four defeats, but led the competition's attendance, with an average of 19,000 supporters per match.

In 1985, Bangu was the runner-up of Campeonato Brasileiro, gaining the right to compete in the following year's Copa Libertadores.

In 2004, Bangu was relegated to the Campeonato Carioca Second Level, returning to the first level in 2009, after winning the 2008 second level.

Achievements

International
 International Soccer League:
 Winners (1): 1960
 President's Cup (Korea):
 Winners (1): 1984
 BTV Cup: (Vietnam)
 Winners (1): 2015

National
 Série A:
 Runners-up (1): 1985
 Torneio dos Campeões:
 Winners (1): 1967
 Campeonato Carioca:
 Winners (2): 1933, 1966
 Runners-up (6): 1951, 1959, 1964, 1965, 1967, 1985
 Campeonato Carioca Série A2:
 Winners (3): 1911, 1914, 2008
 Runners-up (1): 2005

Stadium

Bangu's stadium is Estádio Guilherme Da Silveira Filho, popularly known as Moça Bonita, built in 1947, with a maximum capacity of 15,000 people.

Rivals
Bangu's biggest rivals are América, Ceres, and Campo Grande.

Current squad

Mascot
Bangu's mascot is a beaver, known as castor in Portuguese. Castor de Andrade, a banker of Jogo do Bicho (illicit game in Brazil) financially supported the club for several years. The mascot was created in Castor de Andrade's era.

Notable coaches
 Ademar Pimenta, 1935–1936, Brazilian World Cup coach 1938
 Aymoré Moreira, 1949–1950, Brazilian World Cup coach 1962
 Ondino Viera, (Uruguay), 1950–1953, 1967, champion coach, e.g. with Vasco da Gama, Botafogo and in Uruguay und Argentina
 Tim, 1953–1956, 1959–1960, 1963–1964, 1980
 Flávio Costa, 1970, Brazilian World Cup coach 1950
 Dorival Knippel "Yustrich", 1978
 Zizinho, 1980
 Paulo César Carpegiani, 1986, Club World Cup winner with Flamengo
 Mário Zagallo, 1988, World Cup Winner as coach and Manager
 Moisés, 1983–85

Bangu's top scorers
 Ladislau da Guia – 215 goals
 Moacir Bueno – 162 goals
 Nívio – 130 goals
 Menezes – 119 goals
 Zizinho – 115 goals
 Paulo Borges – 105 goals
 Arturzinho – 93 goals
 Marinho – 83 goals
 Luís Carlos – 81 goals
 Décio Esteves and Luisão – 71 goals

Most matches played
 Ubirajara Motta – 280 matches
 Ladislau da Guia – 256 matches
 Zózimo – 256 matches
 Serjão – 249 matches
 Nilton dos Santos – 232 matches
 Moacir Bueno – 231 matches
 Décio Esteves – 221 matches
 Gilmar – 221 matches
 Luisão – 220 matches
 Luiz Antônio da Guia – 216 matches

References

https://web.archive.org/web/20150402131514/http://www.bangu-ac.com.br/jogadores.htm

External links
'back to Rio'. RGSSA blog post contains image of 'The Bangu Football Grounds: Central Railway', c. 1914
Official Site (inactive)
Unofficial Site 

 
Association football clubs established in 1904
Football clubs in Rio de Janeiro (state)
Football clubs in Rio de Janeiro (city)
United Soccer Association imported teams
1904 establishments in Brazil
Works association football teams